Paul Crane (January 29, 1944 – November 1, 2020) was an American football center for seven seasons for the New York Jets.

Paul Crane graduated in 1962 from Vigor High School in Prichard, Alabama, near Mobile.
 
He played college football for the University of Alabama.

Crane died November 1, 2020 at the age of 76.

References

1944 births
2020 deaths
People from Pascagoula, Mississippi
Players of American football from Mississippi
Alabama Crimson Tide football players
All-American college football players
American football centers
New York Jets players
Vigor High School alumni
American Football League players